David Kane may refer to:

Dave Kane (born 1948), American radio talk show host
Dave Kane (musician), musician, composer and band leader
David Kane (pianist) (born 1955), American pianist, composer, and arranger
Black Manta (David Kane), fictional nemesis of DC Comics character Aquaman

See also
David Cane (disambiguation)
David Cain (disambiguation)